Prion is a misfolded proteins which characterize several fatal neurodegenerative diseases in humans and many other animals. It may also refer to:

Names 
Eran Prion (born 1974), Israeli musician and music producer based in Tel Aviv

Places 
Prion Island, located at 2.4 km (1.5 mi) north-northeast of Luck Point, lying in the Bay of Isles, South Georgia

Science 
Fungal prion, prion that infects fungal hosts
Prion protein, human gene encoding for the major prion protein PrP (for prion protein)
Prion diseases, group of progressive and invariably fatal symptoms affecting the brain (encephalopathies) and nervous system of many animals
Prion pruritus, intense itching during the prodromal period of the Creutzfeldt–Jakob disease
Prion pseudoknot, predicted RNA pseudoknot structure found in prion protein mRNA

Other uses 
Prion Humour Classics, series of small-format hardback novels published by Prion Books in the UK 
National Prion Clinic (UK), a British specialist prion disease clinic

See also 
List of prions